The Pamunkey Indian Reservation is a Native American reservation of the Pamunkey Indian Tribe located in King William, Virginia, United States. This reservation lies along the Pamunkey River in King William County, Virginia on the Middle Peninsula. It contains approximately 1,200 acres (4.8 km2) of land, 500 acres (2 km2) of which is wetlands with numerous creeks. Thirty-four families reside on this reservation and many Tribal members live in nearby Richmond, Newport News, and other parts of Virginia.

History

It was confirmed to the Pamunkey tribe as early as 1658 by the Governor, the council, and the General Assembly of Virginia. The treaty of 1677 between the King of England, acting through the Governor of Virginia, and several Native American tribes including the Pamunkey is the most important existing document describing Virginia's relationship towards Indian land. The Pamunkey tribe early ancestors had locations as far north as the Middle Peninsula of Virginia and as far south as South Hampton Roads in Virginia.  A burial mound, reported to contain the remains of Chief Powhatan, father of Matoaka (better known to historians as Pocahontas), is also located on this Reservation next to railroad tracks. His brother Opechancanough relocated his remains here. He is also buried here.

References
Virginia's First People: Past and Present, virginiaindians.pwnet.org

External links

Archaeological sites on the National Register of Historic Places in Virginia
American Indian reservations in Virginia
Geography of King William County, Virginia
National Register of Historic Places in King William County, Virginia
Historic districts on the National Register of Historic Places in Virginia
Pamunkey
1658 establishments in Virginia